The Journal of Computational Biology is a monthly peer-reviewed scientific journal covering computational biology and bioinformatics. It was established in 1994 and is published by Mary Ann Liebert, Inc. The editors-in-chief are Sorin Istrail (Brown University) and Michael S. Waterman (University of Southern California). According to the Journal Citation Reports, the journal has a 2018 impact factor of 0.879.

Since 1997, authors of accepted proceedings papers at the Research in Computational Molecular Biology (RECOMB) conference have been invited to submit a revised version to a special issue of the journal.

References

External links 
 

Mary Ann Liebert academic journals
Publications established in 1994
English-language journals
Hybrid open access journals
Bioinformatics and computational biology journals
Monthly journals